The Immortal is a 2018 Vietnamese film directed by Victor Vu. The twelfth feature film by Vu, it tells the story of a man who has lived across three centuries after making himself immortal through dark magic. US premiered at the 11th Viet Film Fest in 2019 and won the Award for Best Cinematography for a Feature film.

Synopsis
The film opens with scene An (Đinh Ngọc Diệp) constantly sleepwalking, every time she wakes up she is in a distant place. Looking for solutions to these strange dreams, and at the same time finding a way to save the daughter who is slowly dying of cancer. An discovers the life of the immortal man (Quách Ngọc Ngoan) and the dark secrets.

From a gentle young man who is having a love affair with a beautiful songstress named Liên (Jun Vũ), Hùng is assassinated and lost everything. On the day of his return, Hùng yearns to regain everything that was once his own. Ambition and hatred led Hùng to seek magic - charms, to fight death and to make those who harm him pay the price. However, "the more magical the spell, the more terrible the price must pay", and the price that Hung has to pay is to become a slave of his own destiny.

Cast
 Quách Ngọc Ngoan as Hung
 Ngọc Diệp as An
 Jun Vu as Lien
 Thanh Tu as Duyen
 François Négret as DeBray
 Lâm Vissay as Khang
 Trương Thế Vinh as Cuong
 Vũ Tuấn Việt as Damien
 Cường Seven as Loc
 Chiều Xuân as Madam Nhung
 Bùi Bài Bình as Thay Ninh
 Nguyễn Văn Báu as Old man Dao
 Tu Trinh as Aunty Bau
 Kim Xuân as Psychic
 Phi Huyền Trang as Nga
 Duong Tan Giang as Doctor
 Yến Nhi as Be Linh (An's Daughter)
 Lý Thanh Bình as An's Husband
 Huu Thach as Debray's Private Doctor
 Tấn Thi as Dr. Trong Tu

Reception
Reviews were mixed.  One reviewer stated "the greatest value of the Immortal lies in the effort to pave the way, not the quality. From here, other directors can be more confident to exploit the unfamiliar fantasy genre. When a good movie comes out, one can recall that the Immortal started it all." but criticized "a messy script about details, lack of genre orientation, follows the overly and extremely weak formula in character building."

Another review stated that overall, Immortal is "a very worth watching Vietnamese work, especially for those who are fans of Victor Vu", praising "elaborately invested cinematographic work, novel storylines and ghosts ... Although there is an incomplete ending, which can make many viewers disappointed and bewildered"

Awards and nominations

References

External links
 

Vietnamese drama films
2018 films